Baladna is a Qatari agricultural company that raises livestock and produces dairy products. It is Qatar's largest locally-owned food and dairy producer, supplying over 95% of the country's fresh dairy products.

Baladna was co-founded by Qatari businessman Moutaz Al-Khayyat and Ramez Al-Khayyat, and is part of Power International Holding. The farms and Dairy Factories are managed by CEO Malcolm Jordan.

History
The company was founded as a sheep and goat farm. In May 2017, it began producing processed dairy products for the Qatari market.

In the wake of the June 2017 suspension of diplomatic ties of several Gulf countries with Qatar, Baladna, with state support, expanded rapidly into producing cow's milk, which had been supplied to Qatar primarily by Saudi Arabia. The company purchased 3,400 cows, and began milking them in July at a farm in Umm al Hawaya.  Baladna planned to continue expanding its herd. 

The farm is now home to 22,000 cows, with a potential current capacity of 24,000. The cows are fed hay imported from Asia, Europe and Africa. Baladna's current facilities cover 2 million square metres and are spread across two farms that house 40 barns with state-of-the-art milking parlours. Baladna has a current capacity to manufacture 700,000 to 900,000 litres of beverages per day. About 80% of the farm's output is enough to meet domestic Qatari demand, with the remainder exported. Baladna’s main goal is to reach self-sufficiency of dairy production in Qatar. After reaching self-sufficiency the company moved to exporting their dairy products and began producing juice products.

On 17 October 2019, Baladna announced its intention to float on the Qatar Exchange. By the end of October, Baladna launched an initial public offering that is expected to raise 1.426 billion riyals ($392 million). The stocks were offered only to Qatari individuals and companies at first. However, foreigners will be able to own up to 49% of shares from an unspecified future date.

In June 2019, exactly two years after the diplomatic crisis, Baladna confirmed that it is now supplying half of Qatar’s fresh milk. The company also started exporting milk to Afghanistan, Yemen with plans to extend to Oman and other countries soon. By early 2021, the company was exporting to eleven countries including Pakistan and Libya, and targeting revenue growth of 15-20% revenue growth annually over the following five years.

Baladna launched a budget-conscious brand, Awafi, in 2020 in response to consumer trends in the region. On August 6 2020, the company announced a 7-month net profit of QR 84million and revenues reaching QR 442million, which they attributed to improved productivity “positively strengthening margin delivery”. Speaking to Bloomberg Daybreak about the results, Managing Director Ramez Al-Khayyat said Baladna planned to continue growing its product portfolio, and increase its presence and exports outside of Qatar. 

In 2021 the company announced its intention to invest in crop farming. In Europe, Baladna will invest in 5,000 hectares of land in Romania, intended to grow 85% of the feed for Baladna’s herd. The company also intends to grow crops in Qatar for the first time, using centre pivot irrigation to cultivate alfafa for cattle feed. 

Baladna became a founding member of the Children's Museum of Qatar in June 2021.

References

Agriculture companies of Qatar
Dairy products companies
Food and drink companies of Qatar